Las Montañas is one of 54 parish councils in Cangas del Narcea, a municipality within the province and autonomous community of Asturias, in northern Spain.

Villages
 Las Abieras
 Las Defradas de las Montañas
 Fontes de las Montañas
 Ḷḷeirón
 El Pumar
 San Fliz
 San Pedru las Montañas

References

Parishes in Cangas del Narcea